Matthew Calbraith Perry (April 10, 1794 – March 4, 1858) was a commodore of the United States Navy who commanded ships in several wars, including the War of 1812 and the Mexican–American War (1846–1848). He played a leading role in the opening of Japan to the West with the Convention of Kanagawa in 1854.

Perry was interested in the education of naval officers and assisted in the development of an apprentice system that helped establish the curriculum at the United States Naval Academy. With the advent of the steam engine, he became a leading advocate of modernizing the U.S. Navy and came to be considered "The Father of the Steam Navy" in the United States.

Lineage
Matthew Perry was a member of the Perry family, a son of Sarah Wallace (née Alexander) (1768–1830) and Navy Captain Christopher Raymond Perry (1761–1818). He was born April 10, 1794, South Kingstown, Rhode Island. His siblings included Oliver Hazard Perry, Raymond Henry Jones Perry, Sarah Wallace Perry, Anna Marie Perry (mother of George Washington Rodgers), James Alexander Perry, Nathaniel Hazard Perry, and Jane Tweedy Perry (who married William Butler).

His mother was born in County Down, Ireland and was a descendant of an uncle of William Wallace, the Scottish knight and landowner. His paternal grandparents were James Freeman Perry, a surgeon, and Mercy Hazard, a descendant of Governor Thomas Prence, a co-founder of Eastham, Massachusetts, who was a political leader in both the Plymouth and Massachusetts Bay colonies, and governor of Plymouth; and a descendant of Mayflower passengers, both of whom were signers of the Mayflower Compact, Elder William Brewster, the Pilgrim colonist leader and spiritual elder of the Plymouth Colony, and George Soule, through Susannah Barber Perry.

Naval career
President was in a victorious engagement over a British vessel, shortly before the War of 1812 was officially declared. Rodgers fired the first shot of the war at Belvidera. A later shot resulted in a cannon bursting, killing several men and wounding Rodgers, Perry and others.

Following the signing of the Treaty of Ghent which ended the war, Perry served on various vessels in the Mediterranean Sea. Perry served under Commodore William Bainbridge during the Second Barbary War. He then served in African waters aboard USS Cyane during its patrol off Liberia from 1819 to 1820. After that cruise, Perry was sent to suppress piracy and the slave trade in the West Indies.

Opening of Key West
Perry placed in commission and commanded , a schooner with 12 guns, from 1821 to 1825. He deployed to the West Africa Station to support the American and British joint patrols to prevent human trafficking.

In 1815, the Spanish governor in Havana deeded the island of Key West to Juan Pablo Salas of St. Augustine in Spanish Florida. After Florida was transferred to the United States, Salas sold Key West to American businessman John W. Simonton for $2,000 in 1821. Simonton lobbied Washington to establish a naval base on Key West both to take advantage of its strategic location and to bring law and order to the area.  On March 25, 1822, Perry sailed Shark to Key West and planted the U.S. flag, physically claiming the Florida Keys as United States territory. Perry renamed Cayo Hueso "Thompson's Island" for the Secretary of the Navy Smith Thompson and the harbor "Port Rodgers" for the president of the Board of Navy Commissioners. Neither name stuck however.

From 1826 to 1827, Perry acted as fleet captain for Commodore Rodgers. Perry returned to Charleston, South Carolina, for shore duty in 1828 and in 1830 took command of a sloop-of-war, . During this period, while in port in Russian Kronstadt, Perry was offered a commission in the Imperial Russian Navy, which he declined.

He spent 1833 through 1837 as second officer of the New York Navy Yard (later the Brooklyn Navy Yard), gaining promotion to captain at the end of this tour.

Father of the Steam Navy

Perry had an ardent interest in and saw the need for naval education, supporting an apprentice system to train new seamen, and helped establish the curriculum for the United States Naval Academy. He was a vocal proponent of modernizing the Navy. Once promoted to captain, he oversaw construction of the Navy's second steam frigate , which he commanded after its completion. He was called "The Father of the Steam Navy", and he organized America's first corps of naval engineers, and conducted the first U.S. naval gunnery school while commanding Fulton from 1839 to 1841 off Sandy Hook on the coast of New Jersey.

Promotion to commodore
Perry received the title of commodore in June 1840, when the Secretary of the Navy appointed him commandant of New York Navy Yard. The United States Navy did not have ranks higher than captain until 1857, so the title of commodore carried considerable importance.  Officially, an officer would revert to his permanent rank after the squadron command assignment had ended, although in practice officers who received the title of commodore retained the title for life, as did Perry.

During his tenure in Brooklyn, he lived in Quarters A in Vinegar Hill, a building which still stands today. In 1843, Perry took command of the Africa Squadron, whose duty was to interdict the slave trade under the Webster-Ashburton Treaty, and continued in this endeavor through 1844.

Mexican–American War

In 1845, Commodore David Conner's length of service in command of the Home Squadron had come to an end. However, the coming of the Mexican–American War persuaded the authorities not to change commanders in the face of the war. Perry, who would eventually succeed Conner, was made second-in-command and captained . Perry captured the Mexican city of Frontera, demonstrated against Tabasco, being defeated in San Juan Bautista by Colonel Juan Bautista Traconis in the First Battle of Tabasco, and took part in the capture of Tampico on November 14, 1846.

He had to return to Norfolk, Virginia, to make repairs and was still there when the amphibious landings at Veracruz took place. His return to the U.S. gave his superiors the chance to finally give him orders to succeed Commodore Conner in command of the Home Squadron. Perry returned to the fleet, and his ship supported the siege of Veracruz from the sea. After the fall of Veracruz, Winfield Scott moved inland, and Perry moved against the remaining Mexican port cities. Perry assembled the Mosquito Fleet and captured Tuxpan in April 1847. In July 1847 he attacked Tabasco personally, leading a 1,173-man landing force ashore and attacking the city of San Juan Bautista from land, defeating the Mexican forces and taking the city.

Perry Expedition: opening of Japan, 1852–1854

In 1852, Perry was assigned a mission by American President Millard Fillmore to force the opening of Japanese ports to American trade, through the use of gunboat diplomacy if necessary. The growing commerce between the United States and China, the presence of American whalers in waters offshore Japan, and the increasing monopolization of potential coaling stations by European powers in Asia were all contributing factors. Shipwrecked foreign sailors were either imprisoned or executed, and the safe return of such persons was one demand. The Americans were also driven by concepts of manifest destiny and the desire to impose the benefits of western civilization and the Christian religion on what they perceived as backward Asian nations. The Japanese were forewarned by the Dutch of Perry's voyage but were unwilling to change their 250-year-old policy of national seclusion. There was considerable internal debate in Japan on how best to meet this potential threat to Japan's economic and political sovereignty.

On November 24, 1852, Perry embarked from Norfolk, Virginia, for Japan, in command of the East India Squadron in pursuit of a Japanese trade treaty.

Perry then switched his flag to Susquehanna and made call at Naha on Great Lewchew Island (Ryukyu, now Okinawa) from May 17–26. Ignoring the claims of Satsuma Domain to the islands, he demanded an audience with the Ryukyuan King Shō Tai at Shuri Castle and secured promises that the kingdom would be open to trade with the United States. Continuing on to the Ogasawara islands in mid-June, Perry met with the local inhabitants and purchased a plot of land.

First visit (1853)
Perry reached Uraga at the entrance to Edo Bay in Japan on July 8, 1853. His actions at this crucial juncture were informed by a careful study of Japan's previous contacts with Western ships and what he knew about the Japanese hierarchical culture. As he arrived, Perry ordered his ships to steam past Japanese lines towards the capital of Edo and turn their guns towards the town of Uraga. Perry refused Japanese demands to leave or to proceed to Nagasaki, the only Japanese port open to foreigners.

Perry attempted to intimidate the Japanese by presenting them a white flag and a letter which told them that in case they chose to fight, the Americans would destroy them. He also fired blank shots from his 73 cannon, which he claimed was in celebration of the American Independence Day. Perry's ships were equipped with new Paixhans shell guns, cannons capable of wreaking great explosive destruction with every shell. He also ordered his ship boats to commence survey operations of the coastline and surrounding waters over the objections of local officials.

Meanwhile, shōgun Tokugawa Ieyoshi was ill and incapacitated, which resulted in governmental indecision on how to handle the unprecedented threat to the nation's capital. On July 11, Rōjū Abe Masahiro bided his time, deciding that simply accepting a letter from the Americans would not constitute a violation of Japanese sovereignty. The decision was conveyed to Uraga, and Perry was asked to move his fleet slightly southwest to the beach at Kurihama where he was allowed to land on July 14, 1853. After presenting the letter to attending delegates, Perry departed for Hong Kong, promising to return the following year for the Japanese reply.

Second visit (1854)

On his way back to Japan, Perry anchored off Keelung in Formosa, known today as Taiwan, for ten days. Perry and crewmembers landed on Formosa and investigated the potential of mining the coal deposits in that area. He emphasized in his reports that Formosa provided a convenient, mid-way trade location. Perry's reports noted that the island was very defensible and could serve as a base for exploration in a similar way that Cuba had done for the Spanish in the Americas. Occupying Formosa could help the United States counter European monopolization of the major trade routes. The United States government failed to respond to Perry's proposal to claim sovereignty over Formosa. 

To command his fleet, Perry chose officers with whom he had served in the Mexican–American War. Commander Franklin Buchanan was captain of Susquehanna, and Joel Abbot (Perry's second in command) was captain of Macedonian. Commander Henry A. Adams was chief of staff with the title "Captain of the Fleet". Major Jacob Zeilin (future commandant of the United States Marine Corps) was the ranking Marine officer and was stationed on Mississippi.
Perry returned on 13 February 1854, after only half a year rather than the full year promised, and with ten ships and 1,600 men. Both actions were calculated to put even more pressure onto the Japanese. After initial resistance, Perry was permitted to land at Kanagawa, near the site of present-day Yokohama on March 8, and the Convention of Kanagawa was signed on 31 March. Perry signed as American plenipotentiary, and Hayashi Akira, also known by his title of Daigaku-no-kami, signed for the Japanese side. Perry departed, mistakenly believing the agreement had been made with imperial representatives, not understanding the true position of the shōgun, the de facto ruler of Japan. Perry then visited Hakodate on the northern island of Hokkaido and Shimoda, the two ports which the treaty stipulated would be opened to visits by American ships.

Return to the United States (1855)
When Perry returned to the United States, Congress voted to grant him a reward of $20,000 (US $ in ) in appreciation of his work in Japan. He used part of this money to prepare and publish a report on the expedition in three volumes, titled Narrative of the Expedition of an American Squadron to the China Seas and Japan. He was promoted to rear admiral on the retired list (when his health began to fail) as a reward for his service in the Far East.

Last years

Living in his adopted home of New York City, Perry's health began to fail as he suffered from cirrhosis of the liver from heavy drinking. Perry was known to have been an alcoholic, which compounded the health complications leading to his death. He also suffered severe arthritis that left him in frequent pain, and on occasion precluded him from his duties. Perry spent his last years preparing for the publication of his account of the Japan expedition, announcing its completion on December 28, 1857. Two days later he was detached from his last post, an assignment to the Naval Efficiency Board. He died awaiting further orders on March 4, 1858, in New York City, of rheumatic fever that had spread to the heart, compounded by complications of gout and alcoholism.

Initially interred in a vault on the grounds of St. Mark's Church in-the-Bowery, in New York City, Perry's remains were moved to the Island Cemetery in Newport, Rhode Island on March 21, 1866, along with those of his daughter, Anna, who died in 1839. In 1873, an elaborate monument was placed by Perry's widow over his grave in Newport.

Personal life
Perry was married to Jane Slidell Perry (1797–1864), sister of United States Senator John Slidell (1793–1871), in New York on December 24, 1814, and they had ten children:

 Jane Slidell Perry (c. 1817–1880)
 Sarah Perry (1818–1905), who married Col. Robert Smith Rodgers (1809–1891)
 Jane Hazard Perry (1819–1881), who married John Hone (1819–1891) and Frederic de Peyster (1796–1882)
 Matthew Calbraith Perry (1821–1873), a captain in the United States Navy and veteran of the Mexican War and the Civil War.
 Susan Murgatroyde Perry (c. 1824–1825)
 Oliver Hazard Perry (c. 1825–1870)
 William Frederick Perry (1828–1884), a 2nd Lieutenant, United States Marine Corps, 1847–1848.
 Caroline Slidell Perry Belmont (1829–1892), who married financier August Belmont.
 Isabella Bolton Perry (1834–1912), who married George T. Tiffany
 Anna Rodgers Perry (c. 1838–1839)

In 1819, Perry joined the masonic Holland Lodge No. 8 in New York City, New York.

Legacy
Perry was a key agent in both the making and recording of Japanese history, as well as in the shaping of Japanese history; 90% of school children in Japan can identify him. He was responsible for gaining partnership with Japan and establishing a "firm, lasting, and sincere friendship between the two nations..."

As portrayed by the U.S., both in writing and photographs, Perry was a man of authority and respect. He appeared as a well-mannered, sophisticated man. However, the Japanese portrayed him as a person with little respect. Japanese woodblock prints of Perry show him with droopy, wide eyes and an elongated nose and face. In some, his features are exaggerated to the extent of making him appear demonic and goblin-like. They make him out to be a stereotypical "blue-eyed, hairy barbarian." These blue eyes are something associated with the West, although the blue is used in the whites of the eyes rather than the iris. Blue eyes are something as foreign to Japanese as the West itself. The prints are more than just unique artist interpretations—they speak to the collective view of Perry. He is depicted, both in prints and in writing, as stern, uptight, and unpleasant. These perceptions have carried over into the Japanese perception of Western civilization as a whole. The Japanese perceived Perry as so because of the control he was trying to obtain in Japan. It is probable that Perry represented the parts of Western Civilization that the Japanese did not like, or were afraid of. These images augment feelings of fear, of both the known and the unknown. Japan saw what happened to China and other countries where the "West was superior." Western society, personified by Perry, was viewed with “unreasonable obstinacy."

Pacific Overtures is a musical set in Japan beginning in 1853 and follows the difficult westernization of Japan, told from the point of view of the Japanese.

A replica of Perry's U.S. flag is on display on board the  memorial in Pearl Harbor, Hawaii, attached to the bulkhead just inboard of the Japanese surrender signing site on the starboard side of the ship. The original flag was brought from the U.S. Naval Academy Museum to Japan for the Japan surrender ceremony and was displayed on that occasion at the request of Douglas MacArthur, who was a blood-relative of Perry. 
Today, the flag is preserved and on display at the Naval Academy Museum in Annapolis, Maryland. In the museum, the flag is displayed the 'wrong' way round. However, photographs show that at the signing ceremony, this flag was displayed properly, on its starboard side, with the stars in the upper right corner; as are all flags on vessels (known as ensigns).  The cloth of this historic flag was so fragile that the conservator at the museum directed that a protective backing be sewn on it, which accounts for its currently being displayed 'port' side round.

Memorials
Japan erected a monument to Perry on July 14, 1901, at the spot where the commodore first landed. The monument survived World War II and is now the centerpiece of a small seaside park called Perry Park at Yokosuka, Japan. Within the park there is a small museum dedicated to the events of 1854. Matthew C. Perry Elementary and High School can be found on Marine Corps Air Station, Iwakuni.

At his birthplace in Newport, there is a memorial plaque in Trinity Church, Newport and a statue of Perry in Touro Park. It was designed by John Quincy Adams Ward, erected in 1869, and dedicated by his daughter. He was buried in Newport's Island Cemetery, near his parents and brother. There are also exhibits and research collections concerning his life at the Naval War College Museum and at the Newport Historical Society.

The U.S. Navy's s (purchased in the 1970s and 1980s) were named after Perry's brother, Commodore Oliver Hazard Perry.

See also
History of Japan
Meiji Restoration
Yokohama Archives of History
Bibliography of early American naval history
 Sakoku
 List of Westerners who visited Japan before 1868

Citations

References 

 Perry, Matthew Calbraith. (1856). Narrative of the expedition of an American Squadron to the China Seas and Japan, 1856. New York : D. Appleton and Company. digitized by University of Hong Kong Libraries,
 Perry, Matthew Calbraith, and Roger Pineau. The Japan expedition, 1852-1854: the personal journal of Commodore Matthew C. Perry (Smithsonian Institution Press, 1968).

Further reading

 Blumberg, Rhoda. (1985) Commodore Perry in the Land of the Shogun (Lothrop, Lee & Shepard Books, 1985) 
 Cullen, Louis M. (2003).  A History of Japan, 1582–1941: Internal and External Worlds. Cambridge: Cambridge University Press.  (cloth),  (paper)

 Hawks, Francis. (1856).  Narrative of the Expedition of an American Squadron to the China Seas and Japan Performed in the Years 1852, 1853 and 1854 under the Command of Commodore M.C. Perry, United States Navy. Washington: A.O.P. Nicholson by order of Congress, 1856; originally published in Senate Executive Documents, No. 34 of 33rd Congress, 2nd Session.  [reprinted by London:Trafalgar Square, 2005. ]
 Kitahara, Michio. "Commodore Perry and the Japanese: a Study in the Dramaturgy of Power." Symbolic Interaction 9.1 (1986): 53–65.
Morison, Samuel Eliot. (1967). "Old Bruin": Commodore Matthew C. Perry, 1794-1858: The American naval officer who helped found Liberia, Hunted Pirates in the West Indies, Practised Diplomacy With the Sultan of Turkey and the King of the Two Sicilies; Commanded the Gulf Squadron in the Mexican War, Promoted the Steam Navy and the Shell Gun, and Conducted the Naval Expedition Which Opened Japan (1967) online free to borrow a standard scholarly biography]
 Sewall, John S. (1905).   The Logbook of the Captain's Clerk: Adventures in the China Seas. Bangor, Maine: Chas H. Glass & Co. [reprint by Chicago: R.R. Donnelly & Sons, 1995] 
 Yellin, Victor Fell. (1996) "Mrs. Belmont, Matthew Perry, and the 'Japanese Minstrels'." American Music (1996): 257–275. online

External links

 "China Through Western Eyes."
  Black Ships & Samurai Commodore Perry and the Opening of Japan (1853-1854), by John W Dower
 A short timeline of Perry's life
 Perry Visits Japan: A Visual History
 
 Kitahara, Michio. Commodore Perry and the Japanese: A Study in the Dramaturgy of Power, 1986
 Narrative of the Expedition of an American Squadron to the China Seas and Japan, by M.C. Perry, at archive.org

1794 births
1858 deaths
United States Navy commodores
American people of English descent
American people of Scottish descent
1850s in Japan
History of Key West, Florida
Meiji Restoration
People from Newport, Rhode Island
Military personnel from New York City
People from Briarcliff Manor, New York
People from Rhode Island in the War of 1812
Matthew C
United States Navy admirals
19th-century American naval officers
Burials in Rhode Island
Foreign relations of the Tokugawa shogunate
American Freemasons
People from South Kingstown, Rhode Island